Carmelo Enrique Valencia Chaverra (born 13 July 1984) is a former Colombian soccer player who retired in Atlético Junior.

Club career
Carmelo Valencia's greatest performance came in the 4-1 victory of Junior de Barranquilla “tu papá” against the #1 club in Copa Libertadores. He also played really well in the two games in which his team Atletico Nacional faced Atletico Huila for the 2007 Apertura National Championship Mustang Cup. He recorded the only goal in the game at Huila. In the second game he opened the score with a goal after the Huila defenders crashed into each other leading the way to Valencia putting Huila's championship hopes out of reach. The game ended 2-1 and the aggregate score was 3-1 in favor of the reigning champion Atletico Nacional. He then helped Nacional defend their title in the second semester finals versus La Equidad by scoring the first goal in a 3-0 defeat of the capital's team. He's now scored a combined three goals in Colombian Mustang Soccer finals.

Valencia gained notoriety for his public admission that he faked a foul which resulted in the sending off of an opponent, Santa Fe's Agustín Julio, during a league match on 25 April 2009. League officials banned Valencia for one match following their review of the play in the wake of his admission.

On 18 January 2010, Valencia signed for K-League club Ulsan Hyundai on a three-year contract for an undisclosed fee.

Valencia signed a contract with Chinese Super League side Tianjin Teda in February 2013.

In February 2015, Valencia transferred to China League One side Beijing Enterprises Group.

Personal life
Valencia has a wife and a daughter.

Notes

References

External links
 
 
 

1984 births
Living people
Colombian footballers
Colombia international footballers
Atlético Nacional footballers
Real Cartagena footballers
Deportivo Pasto footballers
Millonarios F.C. players
Ulsan Hyundai FC players
Newell's Old Boys footballers
La Equidad footballers
Tianjin Jinmen Tiger F.C. players
Beijing Sport University F.C. players
América de Cali footballers
Independiente  Santa Fe footballers
Cúcuta Deportivo footballers
Atlético Junior footballers
Categoría Primera A players
Argentine Primera División players
K League 1 players
Chinese Super League players
China League One players
Colombian expatriate footballers
Expatriate footballers in Argentina
Colombian expatriate sportspeople in Argentina
Expatriate footballers in South Korea
Colombian expatriate sportspeople in South Korea
Expatriate footballers in China
Colombian expatriate sportspeople in China
Association football forwards
Sportspeople from Chocó Department